Viktoriya Orel (Ukrainian: Вікторія Орел) is a Ukrainian model and beauty pageant titleholder who was crowned as Miss Ukraine Earth 2015 and Ukraine's representative in Miss Earth 2015. where she won alongside

Biography

Early life and career beginnings
Viktoria is having been in vocal training since she was six years old and joins vocal competition ever since. Aside from her vocal training, she also joins modelling competition in Ukraine and overseas. 
Gaining a degree from the Ukrainian Academy of Bank Affairs, Viktoria works as a financial director. Part of her personality as well is she spearheads different charitable activities. Viktoria also speak Russian and English aside from her native Ukrainian.

Queen of Ukraine 2015
Viktoria joined the Queen of Ukraine pageant along 21 other contestants.

Miss Earth 2015
Winning the Miss Earth Ukraine 2015 title, Viktoria competed at Miss Earth 2015 and placed Top 16 .

See also

 Miss Earth
 List of Miss Earth countries

References

1991 births
Miss Earth 2015 contestants
Ukrainian beauty pageant winners
Living people
People from Sumy